Ras al-Amud is a Palestinian neighborhood in East Jerusalem (which is under Israeli occupation), located southeast of the Old City of Jerusalem, overlooking the Palestinian neighborhoods of Silwan to the south and Abu Dis and al-Eizariya to the east, and bordering the Jewish neighborhood of Ma'ale HaZeitim to the north, which overlooks the Temple Mount. There were about 11,922 Arabs living in the neighborhood in 2003.

Israeli settlements
Within Ras al-Amud are two Israeli settlements, Ma'ale HaZeitim and Ma'ale David. Ma'ale David is built on the former site of the headquarters of the police headquarters for the Judea and Samaria District, a reference to the West Bank.

In September 1997, plans for the construction of a Jewish neighbourhood on the land provoked an international outcry. Despite American pressure to halt construction, the plan was backed by Jerusalem mayor Ehud Olmert. Under a compromise reached by Prime Minister Benjamin Netanyahu, three Jewish families left voluntarily, with ten yeshiva students staying on. On October 18, 2009, the Israeli bus cooperative Egged launched a bus route from Ras al-Amud and Ma'ale HaZeitim to Silwan and the Kotel. Critics claimed this was an attempt to "normalize" the Jewish presence.

In 2011, 100 families were living Ma'ale HaZeitim.

The international community considers Israeli settlements in East Jerusalem to be illegal under international law, though Israel disputes this.

Archaeology
An archaeological excavation in Ras al-Amud prior to the construction of a school for Arab girls by the Jerusalem Municipality found remains dating to the Middle Canaanite period (2200–1900 BCE) and the late First Temple period (8th–7th centuries BCE), including a jar handle inscribed with the Hebrew name "Menachem."

In August 2004, a salvage excavation was conducted in the Ras al-Amud neighborhood in the wake of damage to an ancient building while preparing a site for construction. Ceramic finds dating to the Byzantine period included bowls, a cooking pot and a complete lamp. Glass vessels from the Late Byzantine–Umayyad period were also found. Fragments of ceramic pipes, a marble chancel screen and a stone table were recovered from the stone collapse and soil fills. The building is thus believed to have belonged to a Byzantine monastery.

References

Bibliography

 
 
 
 

Arab neighborhoods in Jerusalem